Giannis Dimitriadis (born 5 January 1970) is a retired Greek football defender.

References

1970 births
Living people
Greek footballers
Apollon Pontou FC players
Aris Thessaloniki F.C. players
Athinaikos F.C. players
Panelefsiniakos F.C. players
Ionikos F.C. players
Xanthi F.C. players
Super League Greece players
Association football defenders